The 2005 European Judo Championships were the 16th edition of the European Judo Championships, and were held in Rotterdam, Netherlands from 20 May to 22 May 2005.

Medal overview

Men

Women

Medals table

Results overview

Men

60 kg

66 kg

73 kg

81 kg

90 kg

100 kg

+100 kg

Women

48 kg

52 kg

57 kg

63 kg

70 kg

78 kg

+78 kg

References

External links
 
 2005 European Judo Championships Competition Results - Men and Women (International Judo Federation) Archived from the original on 2006-10-15.

 
European Judo Championships
E
Judo competitions in the Netherlands
Judo Championships
Judo
Sports competitions in Rotterdam
21st century in Rotterdam
May 2005 sports events in Europe